John Asquith (1 February 1932 – 10 September 2009) was an English cricketer. He played in five first-class matches for Cambridge University Cricket Club between 1953 and 1954. He was a school teacher. He and his wife Clare had two daughters and a son.

See also
 List of Cambridge University Cricket Club players

References

External links
 

1932 births
2009 deaths
Cricketers from Carshalton
Cambridge University cricketers
English cricketers